The Rushford Formation is a geologic formation in Pennsylvania. It preserves fossils dating back to the Devonian period.

See also

 List of fossiliferous stratigraphic units in Pennsylvania
 Paleontology in Pennsylvania

References
 

Devonian geology of Pennsylvania
Devonian southern paleotemperate deposits
Devonian geology of New York (state)